(Polish: , , formerly Ziwotitz) is a village in Karviná District, Moravian-Silesian Region, Czech Republic. It was a separate municipality but after the expansion of the city of Havířov created in 1955 it became administratively a part of this city in 1960. It has a population of 1,339 (2020). It lies in the historical region of Cieszyn Silesia.

The name is patronymic in origin derived from personal name Żywot.

History 

The village was first mentioned in a written document in 1450 as Ziboticze. Politically it belonged then to the Duchy of Teschen, a fee of the Kingdom of Bohemia, which after 1526 became part of the Habsburg monarchy.

After Revolutions of 1848 in the Austrian Empire a modern municipal division was introduced in the re-established Austrian Silesia. The village as a municipality was subscribed to the political and legal district of Cieszyn. According to the censuses conducted in 1880, 1890, 1900 and 1910 the population of the municipality dropped from 383 in 1880 to 606 in 1910 with the majority being native Polish-speakers (growing from 97.1% in 1880 to 99.3% in 1910) accompanied by a small German-speaking minority (at most 12 or 2.6% in 1900) Czech-speaking (at most 6 or 1.6% in 1880). In terms of religion in 1910 the majority were Protestants (55.5%), followed by Roman Catholics (43.3%) and Jews (8 or 1.2%). The village was also traditionally inhabited by Silesian Lachs, speaking Cieszyn Silesian dialect.

After World War I, fall of Austria-Hungary, Polish–Czechoslovak War and the division of Cieszyn Silesia in 1920, it became a part of Czechoslovakia. Following the Munich Agreement, in October 1938 together with the Zaolzie region it was annexed by Poland, administratively adjoined to Cieszyn County of Silesian Voivodeship. It was then annexed by Nazi Germany at the beginning of World War II. After the war it was restored to Czechoslovakia.

Massacre 

It is well known for the most notorious Nazi war crime of World War II in the Zaolzie area - the Żywocice Massacre. On 6 August 1944, 36 residents of Životice and neighbouring villages were shot dead. This number makes it the largest mass murder within Cieszyn Silesia during World War II. Životice was nicknamed "the Silesian Lidice".

From 4-5 August, the members of a locally operating Polish resistance unit of Armia Krajowa under the command of J. Kamiński killed two officers of the Teschen command of the Gestapo and mortally wounded the driver. The innkeeper and a resistance fighter were also killed. The search for the guerrilla members was fruitless, and thus, the Gestapo decided to retaliate against the villagers.

In the early hours of Sunday 6 August, Životice was surrounded by the German Army and the Landwache. Those who refused to register as ethnic Germans and to enter the "Volksliste" (the German ethnic register) were targeted against and had already been marked through documentation. The Landwache and Gestapo officers from Teschen and Kattowitz combed the village, dragged residents out of their houses and shot them nearby. Some took their chances and tried to escape, but were killed. Besides the villagers, other people were murdered while passing through the village, mostly coal miners on their way back from their night shift who failed to produce their Volksliste document. The massacre was directed by Q. Magwitz, the commander of the Teschen headquarters of Gestapo, and targeted civilians who were not involved in the resistance. However, neither Magwitz nor any other perpetrator was tried or punished.

In all, 36 people were killed. Of these twenty-seven were ethnic Poles, eight Czechs, one was registered as "Volksdeutscher" class three. Twenty-four victims were residents of Životice, six were residents of Horní Suchá, four from Dolní Bludovice, one from Dolní Suchá one from Dolní Těrlicko and one from Šenov. The youngest victim was sixteen, the oldest sixty. When the massacre was over, the corpses were loaded on trucks and carried to the old Jewish cemetery in Orlová, where they were dumped in a common grave. The German authorities then entered "cardiac insufficiency" and "cardiac infarct" as the causes of death in the death register. The bodies were transferred from Orlová to Životice when the war was over. On 25 September 1949, a memorial by Franciszek Świder, a Karviná-based Polish sculptor, was unveiled to commemorate the massacre victims. In 1984, a new building was opened next to the memorial to accommodate the exhibition Occupation and Resistance Movement in Cieszyn Silesia 1938-1944. The memorial is dedicated to all victims of German occupation, commemorating the suffering of local residents. This massacre is known as Żywocice Tragedy - Tragedia Żywocicka in Polish or Životická tragédie in Czech.

See also 
 Polish minority in the Czech Republic
 Zaolzie

Footnotes

References 

 
 
 

Villages in Karviná District
Neighbourhoods in the Czech Republic
Havířov